Ugandapithecus is a disputed extinct genus of hominoid primates that existed from 22 to 14 million years ago during the Miocene epoch. Fossil remains are present in Eastern Africa including Kenya and Uganda. Four species have been classified to date. It has been suggested that these successively larger species evolved from one another. Others argue that Ugandapithecus is a subjective synonym of Proconsul.

 Ugandapithecus meswae, 21.5 – 19 Mya (previously Proconsul meswae)
 Ugandapithecus legetetensis, 20 – 19 Mya
 Ugandapithecus major, 19 – 18 Mya (previously Proconsul major)
 Ugandapithecus gitongai, ca. 14.5 Mya

References

Prehistoric apes 
Miocene primates of Africa

Paleofauna of Uganda
Prehistoric primate genera